Phebalium laevigatum is a species of erect, slender shrub that is endemic to Western Australia. It has glandular-warty branchlets, linear to narrow oblong leaves and white or yellow flowers arranged in umbels of about seven on the ends of branchlets.

Description
Flowering occurs from June to October.

Taxonomy
Phebalium laevigatum was first formally described in 1998 by Paul G. Wilson in the journal Nuytsia from specimens collected by Nik Donner east of Merredin.

Distribution and habitat
This phebalium grows in eucalypt scrub and is found between Merredin and the western edge of the Great Victoria Desert.

Conservation status
This phebalium is classified as "not threatened" by the Government of Western Australia Department of Parks and Wildlife.

References

laevigatum
Flora of Western Australia
Plants described in 1998
Taxa named by Paul G. Wilson